The Wessex Group is an association of eleven sixth form colleges.

History 
The partnership was formed in 1997, under the name the Hampshire Sixth Form Colleges' Partnership. The name was changed to reflect the membership of Southampton and Portsmouth colleges, which are not in the Hampshire County Council area.

Members
The membership of the Group is:
Alton College
Barton Peveril College
Sixth Form College, Farnborough
Havant College
Itchen College
Peter Symonds College
Portsmouth College
Queen Mary's College
St Vincent College
Taunton's College
Totton College

Objectives

External links
Wessex Group of Sixth Form Colleges

Sixth form colleges in Hampshire
Wessex
1997 establishments in England